Rez dog (short for reservation dog) is usually a term for outdoor, stray, and feral dogs living on Indigenous reservations in the United States and Canada. The term has taken on many connotations, and has to some extent become an emblem of and metaphor for reservations, reservation life, and Native Americans in general. For example, a "rez dog" may refer to a Native American resident of a reservation.

The distinction between a reservation dog and American dogs in general is often seen as emblematic as the difference between First Nation and majority culture way of life. Untended dogs roaming First Nation reservations and other rural First Nation communities cause problems that the communities must deal with. They are generally thought of as mixed-breed and unsupervised.

In commerce and literature 
A clothing company, "rez dog clothing", has adopted the persona of reservation dogs.

The narrator of two chapters of Antelope Woman, by novelist Louise Erdrich, is described as being part Ojibwe reservation dog, part Lakota dog, and part coyote.

See also 
 Carolina Dog
 Native American dogs
 Pariah dog
 Mixed-breed dog

References 

Dog types
American Indian reservations
Feral dogs